Gracia Shadrack served as the Speaker of the Parliament of Vanuatu from 20 April 2020 to 15 June 2021. He represents Malakula as a member of the Leaders Party of Vanuatu.

Following a government motion to have the speaker removed, and the boycott of parliament by government MPs, Shadrack declared on 8 June 2021 that the seats of the prime minister Bob Loughman, the deputy prime minister, and 16 other MPs were vacant. Supreme Court Justice Oliver Saksak put a stay on the speaker's ruling until a court could formally consider the dispute. Shadrack resigned as speaker on 15 June 2021.  The group of MPs won at the Court of Appeal on 28 October.

On 9 November 2021, the government majority passed a motion to suspend Shadrack for two years for declaring the seats vacant, citing his action as biased and a waste of public funds.  Shadrack said that he would challenge the motion in court.

References 

Living people
Speakers of the Parliament of Vanuatu
Members of the Parliament of Vanuatu
Leaders Party of Vanuatu politicians
Year of birth missing (living people)